Paul Filliat (8 November 1899 – 12 December 1981) was a French racing cyclist. He rode in the 1926 Tour de France.

References

1899 births
1981 deaths
French male cyclists
Place of birth missing